María Fernanda Arozqueta Chahin (born 16 January 1989 in Mexico City, Mexico), known professionally as Fernanda Arozqueta is a Mexican singer and actress and former member of the Mexican pop group, "La Nueva Banda Timbiriche".

Early life
Fernanda Arozqueta was born and raised in Mexico City. She has 3 sisters. Her parents divorced during her childhood. She started singing as a child and participated in dance competitions for ballet, flamenco, and modern dance.She is of half-Syrian descent.

Music career

La Nueva Banda Timbiriche (2007–2009)
When she was 18 years old, she began her music career as a contestant on the Mexican reality television program, Buscando a Timbiriche, La Nueva Banda in 2007. Televisa held auditions throughout Mexico to find members for an updated line-up of the iconic singing group, Timbiriche. The show premiered on Canal de las Estrellas on June 24, 2007. Arozqueta was one of 30 finalists chosen from across Mexico. The competition aired live each week in Mexico and concluded after four months. The contestants trained with vocal coaches and dance teachers while living together in a house. She earned a place in the group's lineup along with six other contestants.

Arozqueta was one of the lead vocalists in "La Nueva Banda Timbriche". The band released their first single, Tú, Tú, Tú on October 25, 2007. The single landed in the top 10 radio charts in Mexico. Their debut self-titled album was released on November 25, 2007 in Mexico. It was released on February 12, 2009 in the U.S. The album debuted at number 49 on the top Mexican album charts and eventually peaked at #18. In February 2008, the album was certified gold in Mexico for more than 50,000 sales. The group toured extensively throughout Mexico and Latin America in 2008 and 2009. They were the opening act at 20 shows for the US leg of RBD's Empezar desde Cero tour in 2008. In 2008, their third single, Solo Tú, was chosen as the theme song for the Mexican telenovela, Cuidado con el ángel, starring Maite Perroni and William Levy. The band filmed a special appearance on an episode of the popular telenovela, En Nombre Del Amor in 2008. Production on their sophomore album began in early 2009, but it was never released. In June 2009, the group announced their separation at a concert in Nuevo Laredo, Mexico due to some of the members' separate projects outside of the band.

Fridas (2011–2014)
In 2011, Arozqeuta formed Fridas, an electro-pop singing duo with her friend and fellow Centro de Educación Artística classmate, Denisse Gares Aragón. The duo performed at various showcases and clubs in Mexico City in late 2011 in early 2012. They started recording their debut album in 2012. Their first and only single, Pruébame was released on November 5, 2012 for iTunes in Mexico. A music video was filmed in November 2012 and premiered exclusively on Telehit in December 2012. To promote the single, they performed at radio festivals and México Suena, a televised concert, featuring popular Mexican performers in 2013. They performed an acoustic set featuring songs from their debut album for fans on Lunadas, a music program for Televisa on March 6, 2013. Their music was also featured on the television shows, Como dice el dicho and Gossip Girl: Acapulco.  Their untitled debut album was recorded in Mexico City and completed in November 2012. It consisted of songs composed by Arozqueta, Aragón, and some of their producers. The proposed album was to include 10 Spanish songs and 1 English-language cover of "Pruébame". An album title nor release date was ever never given and the album was never released. Gares later formed another singing duo without Arozqueta and appeared as a contestant on the music reality competition, La Voz... México in late 2014. The duo split up for unknown reasons in 2014.

Acting career

Early career
Following La Nueva Banda's disbandment in June 2009, Arozqueta was accepted into Centro de Educación Artística, the acting school run by media giant, Televisa, in Mexico City. For three years, she studied voice, acting, and dance and performed in various school plays. She graduated from CEA in 2011. During her time at CEA, she acted in small roles on television programs such as Esperanza del corazón and Cachito de Cielo from 2010 to 2011. In 2013, she auditioned for and earned a spot as one of four co-hosts on "P.M.", a late night pop-cultured oriented television show produced by Televisa. The show targeted a young adult audience using various social media platforms. The program premiered on Canal 5 on September 2, 2013. It aired weeknights from 9 p.m. to 12 a.m.  in Mexico.

2014 to present
In February 2014, she auditioned for a recurring role in El color de la pasión, Televisa's newest telenovela. In March, she was confirmed as a cast member, playing the younger version of one of telenovela's main characters, "Brígida". The telenovela premiered on Canal de las Estrellas on March 17, 2014. She also appeared in the second and third seasons of the musical, Vaselina (Grease in English) from January to July 2014, replacing actress Geraldine Galván, who played "Chiquis" in the play's first season. The play toured multiple cities in Mexico including Guadalajara and Puebla. Its third season ended in July 2014.

In early July 2014, she began filming Hostel D.F., an exclusive web mini-series produced jointly in Mexico and with the Colombian production company, "Mimosa TV". The series filmed in Mexico City. Its first episode premiered on August 3, 2014 on "Mimosatv.com". In late March 2015, she was confirmed as a cast member for the telenovela, Amor de barrio, and portrayed "Dora Luz" on the program. She also joined the cast of ¡Sábados de foro! where she serves as a co-hostess on the news-related program for FORO TV in Mexico.

In January 2016, she began filming the television drama, Yago, in Mexico City. The series is scheduled to first premiere on May 2, 2016 on Univision in the U.S. It is expected to later air in Mexico.

Filmography

Theatre

Discography

Studio Album
With "La Nueva Banda Timbiriche"

Singles
"With "La Nueva Banda Timbiriche"

With "Fridas"

Music video appearances

References

External links

1989 births
Living people
Mexican stage actresses
Mexican telenovela actresses
Mexican television actresses
Buscando a Timbiriche, La Nueva Banda contestants
Actresses from Mexico City
Singers from Mexico City
21st-century Mexican singers
21st-century Mexican women singers